Esfarjan (also Romanized as Esfarjān; also known as Esfaranjān, Samīrum, Semīrom, and Usburjān) is a village in Esfarjan Rural District, in the Central District of Shahreza County, Isfahan Province, Iran. At the 2006 census, its population was 2,724, in 838 families.

References 

Populated places in Shahreza County